Andreas Kalbitz (born 17 November 1972) is a German politician and was from 2013 to 2020 member of the Alternative for Germany (AfD) and since 2017 chairman of the faction of his former party in the Landtag of Brandenburg, a state parliament.

Life and politics 

Kalbitz was born 1972 in Munich and became a paratrooper in the Bundeswehr, the German federal army from 1994 until 2005. His claims that in 2008 he had studied informatics (computer science) proved false in 2017.
Kalbitz was member of various extremist right-wing organisations before he entered the newly founded AfD in 2013.

In May 2020 Kalbitz was removed as Brandenburg Landtag chairman by the party leadership after he was accused of concealing ties to far-right extremist groups. He was succeeded by provisional leader Dennis Hohloch. Also in May, the AfD annulled the membership of Kalbitz, who in response  vowed to "exhaust all legal options" to overrule the decision. In an interview the same month, co-spokesman of the AfD Jörg Meuthen emphasized that the decision had been made on legal rather than political grounds.

In August 2020, Kalbitz punched Hohloch while inside the Brandenburg parliament building, causing Hohloch to be admitted to hospital with internal injuries.

References 

1972 births
Living people
Alternative for Germany politicians
21st-century German politicians
Politicians affected by a party expulsion process